How Not to Die: Discover the Foods Scientifically Proven to Prevent and Reverse Disease is a book by Michael Greger, M.D. with Gene Stone, published in 2015. The book was a New York Times Best Seller.

Notes

See also 
 Dean Ornish
 Joel Fuhrman 
 Caldwell Esselstyn

External links 
 Official website of Michael Greger

American non-fiction books
2015 non-fiction books
Health and wellness books
Flatiron Books books